The Uinta River (historically also spelled Uintah River) is a tributary of the Duchesne River flowing through Duchesne and Uintah counties in Utah, United States. The Uinta is an important source of water for local irrigation. Its tributaries include the Whiterocks River, which joins it near Whiterocks, and the Dry Gulch Creek near Fort Duchesne.

See also

 List of rivers of Utah
 List of tributaries of the Colorado River

References

External links

Rivers of Utah
Rivers of Duchesne County, Utah
Rivers of Uintah County, Utah
Tributaries of the Green River (Colorado River tributary)
Tributaries of the Colorado River in Utah